Un'gok District is a chigu in South P'yŏngan province, North Korea.

Administrative districts
The district is split into 1 rodongjagu (workers' district) and 8 ri (villages):

References

External links
  Map of Pyongan provinces
  Detailed map

Districts of South Pyongan